Éperlecques is a commune in the Pas-de-Calais department in the Hauts-de-France region of France.

Geography
It is a farming commune comprising eight hamlets, all found within the regional nature reserve of the Caps et Marais d'Opale, situated 6 miles (10 km) northwest of Saint-Omer, at the D222 and D219 road junction. The small river Liette runs through the village.

Population

Places of interest
 The Blockhaus d'Éperlecques
 St. Leodegar's church, dating from the sixteenth century.
 Seven chapels.
 Traces of ancient châteaux.
 The flour mill at Seigre.

Twin towns
Éperlecques is twinned with  Zonnebeke in Belgium.

See also
Communes of the Pas-de-Calais department

References

Communes of Pas-de-Calais